Hassan Mohammed (Arabic:حسن محمد) (born 10 September 1989) is an Emirati footballer. He currently plays as a forward .

External links

References

Emirati footballers
1989 births
Living people
Dubai CSC players
Al-Nasr SC (Dubai) players
Al-Wasl F.C. players
UAE First Division League players
UAE Pro League players
Place of birth missing (living people)
Association football forwards